Niko Kijewski (born 28 March 1996) is a German professional footballer who plays as a left-back for Eintracht Braunschweig.

Club career
Kijewski joined the youth setup of Eintracht Braunschweig in 2014 from VfL Osnabrück. He was promoted to the club's senior side for the 2015–16 season.

In 2016, he made his professional debut for Eintracht in the 2. Bundesliga, in a match against SC Paderborn 07.

International career
Kijewski has represented Germany at the youth level. He was part of the German squad at the 2015 UEFA European Under-19 Championship in Greece.

References

External links

1996 births
Living people
Sportspeople from Osnabrück
German footballers
Footballers from Lower Saxony
Association football defenders
Germany youth international footballers
2. Bundesliga players
3. Liga players
Eintracht Braunschweig players
Eintracht Braunschweig II players